Going All the Way is a 1997 American comedy-drama film directed by Mark Pellington, in his feature film directorial debut. The film was written by Dan Wakefield, based on his 1970 novel and stars Jeremy Davies, Ben Affleck, Rachel Weisz, Amy Locane and Rose McGowan. The film was shot on location in Indianapolis, Indiana, the setting of Wakefield's autobiographical novel.

Going All the Way was nominated for two awards at the 1997 Sundance Film Festival, winning a "Special Recognition" for production designer Thérèse DePrez. McGowan, who attended Sundance to promote the film, has alleged that Harvey Weinstein raped her while at the festival that year.

The Original Motion Picture Soundtrack was released on Verve Records in September 1997 (Verve 314 537 908-2) including the song "Tangled and Tempted", co-written for the film by Indianapolis singer/songwriter/producer Tim Brickley.

A re-edit of the film was released in 2022, called Going All the Way: The Director’s Edit. According to the announcement, "the new cut of the 1997 film was rescanned for 4K and features 50 additional minutes of never-before-seen footage. A new title sequence was also created by Sergio Pinheiro, along with 50 minutes of music from composer Pete Adams." Pellington says "this definitive edition of the film feels like a completely different, more character-driven and psychologically complex vision. It is a darker movie, but also far more sensitive and, ultimately, uplifting."

Plot
Two young men return home to Indianapolis after serving time in the Army during the Korean War and search for love and fulfillment in middle America during the conservative 1950s.

Cast
 Jeremy Davies as Williard "Sonny" Burns
 Ben Affleck as Tom "Gunner" Casselman
 Amy Locane as Buddy Porter
 Rachel Weisz as Marty Pilcher
 Rose McGowan as Gale Ann Thayer
 Jill Clayburgh as Alma
 Lesley Ann Warren as Nina

Critical reception
Stephen Holden of The New York Times did not care for the film, especially Pellington's direction:
"When a filmmaker feels compelled to pump up a story through caricature and expressionistic visual tricks, it's usually a sign of distrust in the inherent drama of the material. In Going All the Way, a flashy movie adaptation of Dan Wakefield's popular 1970 novel about growing up in the heartland in the repressed 1950s, Mark Pellington, a director from the world of music video, has inflated a realistic memoir into a garish, hyperkinetic social satire." 
Roger Ebert of The Chicago Sun-Times gave the film 3 out of 4 stars, and called it "a deeper, cleverer film than it first seems. Much of its strength depends on the imploding performance of Jeremy Davies."

Rotten Tomatoes gives the film a rating of 65% from 23 reviews. The consensus summarizes: "Its themes may feel overly familiar, but Going All the Way is set apart from other period coming-of-age films by the strength of its performances."

References

External links 
 
 
 
 
 

1997 films
Films based on American novels
Films set in the 1950s
Films set in Indianapolis
Films shot in Indianapolis
American independent films
Lakeshore Entertainment films
Korean War films
1997 comedy-drama films
Films directed by Mark Pellington
Films scored by Stewart Copeland
Films scored by Tomandandy
American comedy-drama films
PolyGram Filmed Entertainment films
Gramercy Pictures films
Teen sex comedy films
1997 directorial debut films
1997 independent films
1990s English-language films
1990s American films